

The Albatros L102 (company designation) / Albatros Al 102 (RLM designation), was a German  trainer aircraft of the 1930s. It was a parasol-wing landplane, seating the student pilot and instructor in separate, open cockpits.  A biplane floatplane version was also built as the Al 102W, with strut-braced lower wings.

Variants

L102L
The landplane version with tailwheel undercarriage and parasol monoplane wing. Eight built.
 L102W
Two examples built as biplane floatplanes, one of which was designated as the Focke-Wulf Fw 55W.
Al 102L
RLM designation for the L102L landplane
Al 102W
RLM designation for the L102W floatplane

Specifications (L102L)

Notes

References

External links

 German Aircraft between 1919-1945

Parasol-wing aircraft
Single-engined tractor aircraft
1930s German civil trainer aircraft
L102